The 1955 season of the Primera División Peruana, the top category of Peruvian football, was played by 10 teams. The national champions were Alianza Lima. Sporting Tabaco change its name to Sporting Cristal for 1956.

Results

Standings

National title play-off

External links 
 Peru 1955 season at RSSSF
 Peruvian Football League News 

Peru1
1955 in Peruvian football
Peruvian Primera División seasons